The 2018–19 season will be Manchester City Women's Football Club's 31st season of competitive football and its sixth season in the FA Women's Super League and at the top level of English women's football.

Non-competitive

Pre-season

Friendly

2018 Women's International Champions Cup

Friendly

Competitions

Women's Super League

League table

Results summary

Results by matchday

Matches

FA Cup

WSL Cup

Group stage

Knockout rounds

Champions League

Round of 32

Squad information

Playing statistics

Appearances (Apps.) numbers are for appearances in competitive games only including sub appearances
Red card numbers denote:   Numbers in parentheses represent red cards overturned for wrongful dismissal.

Transfers and loans

Transfers in

Transfers out

References

Manchester City W.F.C. seasons